Coolalinga is an outer suburban area in Darwin. Its Local Government Area is the Litchfield Municipality. The name was first used by Len Cant for his store and caravan park on the Stuart Highway. Since Coolalinga Store, the area has become an important commercial centre for the Shire.

Shopping and amenities
Coolalinga is a major service centre for the outer rural Litchfield Shire and is a growing commercial centre. It is home to the Coolalinga Shopping Centre, the largest in the rural area. The shopping centre contains a post office, Woolworths supermarket with liquor and petrol outlets, as well as a pharmacy, cafes and a number of specialty shops.

Outside the main shopping centre are a Veterinary Hospital, the office of the Litchfield Times local newspaper, petrol stations, a caravan park and a number of businesses serving rural industries.

In addition to the existing Woolworths supermarket complex, Darwin based developer Gwelo constructed the 20,000sq m Coolalinga Shopping Village which provided the district with another food store, 3 major national retailers and up to 60 additional specialty stores. The new complex is located on the eastern side of the Stuart Highway and serves the rural suburbs of Litchfield Shire.
 
As part of the Gwelo development a 1000sq m block of land has been set aside for the construction of a seven-story office block which it is hoped will lure Northern Territory Government departments looking to move away from the Darwin CBD. The office and shopping complex is expected to provide 1760 new public parking spaces. On adjacent land, Gwelo has been granted approval to provide 150 new homes, in a mixture of single occupancy and medium density buildings. When complete, this will bring over 400 new residents to the suburb.

The NT Brewing Company Pty Ltd intends to open a tavern and boutique brewery in World War II Nissen Huts adjacent to the Stuart Highway at Coolalinga. A liquor licence was granted in 2009, but as of April 2012, the business has not commenced operations.

Infrastructure

Health
There are no public hospitals in Coolalinga, but for non-urgent consultations, the Coolalinga Medical Centre, a private practice is located on Henning Road. it also has a psychological clinic as part of the health services in Coolalinga. An Amcal pharmacy is in the Coolalinga Shopping Centre. The rural area is served by the Palmerston Health Precinct which includes the Palmerston Community Care Centre, public dental service, St Johns' Ambulance and a Medical Specialists Clinic. Many of these services operate 24 hours. The nearest Public Hospital is Royal Darwin Hospital.

Education
There are no schools located in Coolalinga, but a public school catering for Transition to year 6 is located in nearby Bees Creek. Bees Creek is also home to the Sattler Christian College (formerly Litchfield Christian School). Taminmin Middle School and Taminmin High School in Humpty Doo cater for years 7–12.

Teritiary and Vocational education services are available through Charles Darwin University, with campuses in both Darwin and Palmerston.

Public transport
In late 2011, the Northern Territory Government opened a new $1.8 million bus interchange park and ride facility to provide better public transport services for commuters travelling between the rural area, Darwin and Palmerston. This development includes:

12m x 13.5m shaded bus/drop off terminal 
CCTV surveillance 
a self-cleaning toilet 
water bubbler
irrigated landscaping 
secure push bike enclosure 
60 car park bays
four motor cycle parking bays

The following bus routes operate to the Coolalinga interchange as of April 2012:

Express Route 28 – Humpty Doo to Darwin via Coolalinga and Palmerston Interchange (and reverse) – Monday to Friday
Route 445 – Humpty Doo to Palmerston via Cox Peninsular, Noonamah and Coolalinga (PM service reversed) – Monday to Saturday

In addition to public buses, an asphalt sealed cycle path following the alignment of the closed North Australia Railway links the rural area to Palmerston.

References

External links

https://web.archive.org/web/20080123190745/http://www.nt.gov.au/lands/lis/placenames/origins/greaterdarwin.shtml#c
Gwelo Developments homepage

Suburbs of Darwin, Northern Territory